Defending champions Dylan Alcott and Heath Davidson defeated Andy Lapthorne and David Wagner in the final, 6–3, 6–7(6–8), [12–10] to win the quad doubles wheelchair tennis title at the 2019 Australian Open. It was the first step towards an eventual Grand Slam for Alcott.

Seeds

Draw

References
 Main Draw

Wheelchair Quad Doubles
2019 Quad Doubles